Events from the year 1579 in Ireland.

Incumbent
Monarch: Elizabeth I

Events
July 16 – James FitzMaurice FitzGerald lands with a small force of Irish, Spanish, and Italian troops at Smerwick on the Dingle Peninsula and commences the Second Desmond Rebellion against the rule in Ireland of Elizabeth I of England. The rebellion lasts until 1583 and results in the extinction of the Desmond palatinate. Brian O'Rourke joins.
August 21 – County Cavan is officially established following an agreement between Lord Deputy Henry Sidney and King Aodh Connallach Ó Raghallaigh of East Breifne.
November 13 – Desmond's troops sack Youghal during the Second Desmond Rebellion
East Breifne is renamed Cavan (Irish An Cabhain) after the Shire's main town.
William Oge Martyn attempts to capture or kill the pirate Gráinne O'Malley at her stronghold of Rockfleet.

Births

Deaths
 June 4 – Edmund Tanner (b.c. 1526), an Irish Jesuit, Roman Catholic Bishop of Cork and Cloyne, Ireland, from 1574 to 1579. 
August 31 – Patrick O'Hely, Roman Catholic Bishop of Mayo (executed by the English).

References

 
1570s in Ireland
Ireland
Years of the 16th century in Ireland